Center for Defence Electronics Application Laboratory (DEAL) is a laboratory of the Defence Research & Development Organization (DRDO). Located in Dehradun, its primary function is research and development in the radio communication devices for defence applications. Its mission is development of Radio Communication Systems, Data links, Satellite Communication Systems, Millimeter Wave Communication systems

Areas of work 
 DEAL is developing communication systems and data links for Airawat Airborne Early Warning and Control System.
DEAL is also engaged in development of state of the art image processing technologies. The Image Analysis Center at DEAL has developed many world class image processing software for Defense Forces. The Image Analysis Center has got expertise in the following areas -

Image Archival, Visualization & Interpretation tool, Classification tools, Stereo processing, Target Detection, Radar image processing, Terrain modeling & simulation, Product generation

References

External links 
 DRDO

Defence Research and Development Organisation laboratories
Research institutes in Uttarakhand
Organisations based in Dehradun
Year of establishment missing